David Copperfield is a 1911 American silent short drama film based on the 1850 novel of the same name by Charles Dickens. It is the oldest known film adaptation of the novel.

Overview
The film was made by the Thanhouser Film Corporation, an independent company located in New Rochelle, New York founded by Edwin Thanhouser. The film has been credited to Theodore Marston, but recent research points to George O. Nichols as director.

Plot
David Copperfield consists of three reels and as three separate films, released in three consecutive weeks, with three different titles: The Early Life of David Copperfield, Little Em'ly and David Copperfield, and The Loves of David Copperfield.

Cast
 Flora Foster as David Copperfield as a boy.
 Ed Genung as David Copperfield as a man.
 Marie Eline as Em'ly as a Child
 Florence La Badie as Em'ly as a Woman 
 Mignon Anderson as Dora Spenlow
 Viola Alberti as Betsey Trotwood
 Justus D. Barnes as Ham Peggotty in part one 
 William Russell as Ham Peggotty in part two
 William Garwood Ham Peggotty in part three

Status
A print of the film still exists and is currently in the public domain.

References

External links
 
 
 
 
 

1911 films
1911 drama films
Silent American drama films
American independent films
American silent short films
American black-and-white films
Films based on David Copperfield
Films set in London
Films shot in New York (state)
Thanhouser Company films
1911 short films
1910s independent films
1910s English-language films
Films directed by George Nichols
1910s American films